Cape Palmas Airport  is an airport serving the town of Harper on Cape Palmas, Liberia.

See also
Transport in Liberia
List of airports in Liberia

References

 OurAirports - Cape Palmas
 Great Circle Mapper - Cape Palmas
 Google Earth

External links

Airports in Liberia